The 2017 Judo Grand Prix Düsseldorf was held at the Mitsubishi Electric Halle in Düsseldorf, Germany, from 24 to 26 February 2017.

Medal summary

Men's events

Women's events

Source Results

Medal table

References

External links
 

2017 IJF World Tour
2017 Judo Grand Prix
Judo
Judo competitions in Germany
Judo